Fire Station No. 4, and variations including "Old" or "Engine Company" and other, may refer to:

 Fire Station No. 4 (Miami, Florida), listed on the National Register of Historic Places (NRHP)
Mechanics Engine House No. 4, Macon, Georgia, NRHP-listed
 Fire Station Number 4 (Columbus, Indiana), designed by Robert Venturi, 1966 in architecture
Old Hose House No. 4, Evansville, Indiana, formerly NRHP-listed
Fire Station No. 4 (Des Moines, Iowa), NRHP-listed
Hose Station No. 4, Davenport, Iowa, contributing to NRHP-listed Village of East Davenport, home of International Fire Museum
Portland Fire Museum, Portland, Maine, in the former home of Fire Engine 4
 Fire Station No. 4 (New Bedford, Massachusetts), NRHP-listed
 Old Fire House No. 4 (Kalamazoo, Michigan), NRHP-listed
Firehouse No. 4 (Plainfield, New Jersey), NRHP-listed
 Fire Station No. 4 (Elmira, New York), NRHP-listed
 Fire Station Number 4 (Asheville, North Carolina), NRHP-listed
 Fire Station No. 4 (Pawtucket, Rhode Island)
Number 4 Hook and Ladder Company, Dallas, Texas, NRHP-listed
 Engine House No. 4 (Tacoma, Washington), NRHP-listed 
 Fire Station No. 4 (Madison, Wisconsin), NRHP-listed

See also
List of fire stations